LDI may refer to:
 Lady Davis Institute for Medical Research in Montreal, Canada
 Lawrenceburg Distillers Indiana, the former name of the distillery MGP of Indiana
 Liberty Diversified Industries
 Liability-driven investment strategy
 IATA airport code for Lindi Airport
 LVDS Display Interface, a low-voltage differential signaling interface for flat-panel displays
 Laser Direct Imaging, a type of photoplotting
 La droite indépendante, a former French electoral alliance